The Schiahorn is a mountain of the Plessur Alps, overlooking Davos in the canton of Graubünden. The Schiahorn is located just east of the Strela Pass, where the summit normal route starts.

References

External links

 Schiahorn on Hikr

Mountains of the Alps
Mountains of Graubünden
Mountains of Switzerland
Two-thousanders of Switzerland